Pavla Kinclová (born 19 February 1975) is a Czech gymnast. She competed in five events at the 1992 Summer Olympics.

References

1975 births
Living people
Czech female artistic gymnasts
Olympic gymnasts of Czechoslovakia
Gymnasts at the 1992 Summer Olympics
Sportspeople from Zlín